This page lists people known for their accomplishments in powerlifting.

A-F
Ahmed Abukhater
Alan Aerts
Paul Anderson (weightlifter)
Taylor Atwood
Ted Arcidi
Nick Best
Big E (wrestler)
Fernando Báez (weightlifter)
Dean Bowring
Jean-Pierre Brulois
Hugh Cassidy
Paul Childress
Anthony Clark (powerlifter)
Ed Coan
Stefanie Cohen
Jon Cole (weightlifter)
Harold Collins (strongman)
Tazzie Colomb
Scott Danberg
Connor Dantzler
Vadym Dovhanyuk
Ric Drasin
Stan Efferding
Rachael Ellering
Sergey Fedosienko
C.T. Fletcher
George Frenn
Doug Furnas

G-L
John Gamble (American football)
Lamar Gant
Brad Gillingham
Karl Gillingham
Dan Green (powerlifter)
Billy Gunn
John Haack
Mike Hall (powerlifter)
Shane Hamman
Frederick Hatfield
Van Hatfield
Big James Henderson
Mark Henry
Hideaki Inaba
Hiroyuki Isagawa
Dave Jacoby (powerlifter)
Ransilu Jayathilake
Kirk Karwoski
Bill Kazmaier
Doyle Kenady
Jill Kennedy
Ryan Kennelly
Larry Kidney
Dan Kovacs
Jason Kristal
Janae Kroc
John Kuc
Naomi Kutin
Amanda Lawrence (powerlifter)
Jörgen Ljungberg

M-R
Julius Maddox
Andrey Malanichev
Tom Magee
Precious McKenzie
Daniella Melo
Scot Mendelson
Brent Mikesell
Jill Mills
KC Mitchell
Tyler Moore (powerlifter)
Rohan Murphy
Jesse Norris
Jarosław Olech
Travis Ortmayer
David Ostlund
Larry Pacifico
Phil Pfister
Mark Philippi
Derek Pomana
Derek Poundstone
Steve Pulcinella
Don Reinhoudt
Mark Rippetoe
Gene Rychlak

S-Z
Žydrūnas Savickas
Nick Scott (bodybuilder)
Brian Siders
Jón Páll Sigmarsson
Louie Simmons
Alexey Sivokon
Eric Spoto
Ken Sprague
Brady Stewart
Braun Strowman
Blaine Sumner
Andrey Tarasenko (powerlifter)
Terry Todd
Ano Turtiainen
Berend Veneberg
Dave Waddington
Johnny Wahlqvist
Marshall White
Jim Williams (powerlifter)
O.D. Wilson
Ab Wolders
Bob Young (American football)
Doug Young (powerlifter)

Powerlifters